ENRS may refer to:

Entreprise nationale de Radiodiffusion sonore, an Algerian broadcasting company
Røst Airport, ICAO airport code